Pseudoblennius zonostigma is a species of marine ray-finned fish belonging to the family Cottidae, the typical sculpins. This species is found in the Pacific Ocean where it is found in shallow waters around southern Japan and Korea.

References

Cottinae

Fish described in 1904